Sinikka is a Finnish female given name. Its nameday is celebrated on 2 September. In Finland, it began to be used in the 1930s, and it reached its peak of popularity in the 1940s and 1950s. As of 2012 there are over 55,000 with this name in Finland.  The name Sinikka means blue, and it comes from Sininen, the Finnish word for blue. The name Sini originated as a variant of Sinikka.

Notable people with this name include:
 Sinikka Bohlin, Swedish social democratic politician 
 Sinikka Keskitalo, female long-distance runner from Finland
 Sinikka Kukkonen, Finnish orienteering competitor
 Sinikka Kurkinen, Finnish painter
 Sinikka Laine, Finnish author 
 Sinikka Langeland, Norwegian singer and musician
 Sinikka Mönkäre (born 1947), Finnish politician
 Sinikka Luja-Penttilä (1924–2023), Finnish politician and writer
  (1934–2021), Finnish journalist, non-fiction writer and children's writer

References

Finnish feminine given names